Calosoma strandi is a species of ground beetle in the subfamily of Carabinae. It was described by Stephan von Breuning in 1934.

References

strandi
Beetles described in 1934